Catherine Vernice Glover (born July 23, 1964) is an American professional choreographer, dancer, and singer.

She originally hit the mainstream in television alongside her dance partner Patrick Allen in the duo known simply as "Pat & Cat" on the hit major talent show Star Search hosted by Ed McMahon (of The Tonight Show fame).  Their act was the first to ever achieve a "Perfect Score" of Four Stars on the show.  She was the standout member of the duo, winning the crowd over with her trademark dance move "Cat Scat".

Glover is perhaps best known for her work with Prince in the late 1980s. She choreographed and appeared in several of his videos and his concert film Sign o' the Times, traveled with him as a backing vocalist and dancer on the Sign o' the Times Tour and Lovesexy Tour, and rapped on both The Black Album track "Cindy C." and the Lovesexy song "Alphabet St.". Her "Cat Scat" move appears in the music video for "U Got The Look".  She was supposed to have released an album on Paisley Park, but the project was ultimately canceled.

Following her work with Prince, she released the EP Catwoman in 1989. Since that time, it is reported that she has worked in London and Los Angeles, recording her own material as well as continuing her choreography and performing.

She has recorded with Tim Simenon of Bomb The Bass, plus Louie Louie, and Steve Hopkins.

References

External links

Cat Glover on Myspace

American female dancers
Dancers from Illinois
Living people
American film actresses
American women rappers
African-American actresses
African-American women rappers
Paisley Park Records artists
21st-century American rappers
21st-century American women musicians
1964 births
21st-century African-American women
21st-century African-American musicians
20th-century African-American people
20th-century African-American women
21st-century women rappers